John Coulter, Coalter, or Colter may refer to:
John Coalter (1771–1838), Virginia lawyer
John Colter (c. 1774–1812 or 1813), member of the Lewis and Clark Expedition
John Coulter (Lord Provost), Lord Provost of Glasgow from 1736 to 1738
John Coulter (playwright) (1888–1980), Irish-born Canadian playwright
John Coulter (politician) (born 1930), Australian politician
John Merle Coulter (1851–1928), American botanist
John B. Coulter (1891–1983), American general
Jackie Coulter (1912–1981), Northern Irish former footballer